X Games XIV was a professional extreme sports event that took place in Los Angeles, California, United States from July 31, to August 3, 2008. Events were held at the Staples Center and the Home Depot Center as well as surrounding venues.

Events

Skateboarding

BMX

Moto X

Rallying

References

X Games in Los Angeles
2008 in American sports
2008 in rallying
2008 in multi-sport events